is a feminine Japanese given name.

Possible writings
Yayoi can be written using different kanji characters and can mean:
弥生, "March"
as a given name
彌生, "extensive, life"
The given name can also be written in hiragana or katakana.

People with the name
, Japanese voice actress
, Japanese composer
, Japanese women's footballer
, Japanese artist
, Japanese swimmer
, Japanese speed skater
, Japanese composer and sound designer
, Japanese actress
, Japanese physician and women's rights activist

Fictional characters
Yayoi Kise, aka Cure Peace from the shoujo anime Smile PreCure!
Yayoi, the main heroine of the manga series Mugen Spiral
Yayoi Tsubaki, a character in the fighting game series BlazBlue
Yayoi Fujisawa (やよい), a character in the anime series Stellvia of the Universe
Yayoi Inuzuka (弥生), a character in the light novel, manga, and anime series Kure-nai
Yayoi Matsunaga (弥生), a character in the anime series Nightwalker: The Midnight Detective
Yayoi (弥生) Yukino (雪野), the main character in the anime series Queen Millennia
Yayoi Kamishiro, a main character and possible love interest in the video game Lux-Pain
Yayoi (弥生), the landlady and "mother" of Hiroe Ogawa in the hentai anime and manga F3: Frantic, Frustrated & Female
Yayoi Aoba, a character of the manga and anime series Captain Tsubasa
Yayoi Shinozuka, a character of the visual novel series White Album
Yayoi Shioiri, a character in the manga Loveless
Yayoi Takatsuki, a character in the video games series THE iDOLM@STER
Yayoi Kunizuka, a character in the light novel, manga and anime series Psycho-Pass
Yayoi Ulshade/KyoryuViolet II, a character in the tokusatsu series "Zyuden Sentai Kyoryuger"
Yayoi Yamamoto, a character in the novel Out by Natsuo Kirino

References

Japanese feminine given names